Roland Ephraim Chase (August 14, 1867 – September 14, 1948) was an American lawyer and Republican politician who served as a member of the Virginia Senate and House of Delegates.

References

External links

1867 births
1948 deaths
Republican Party members of the Virginia House of Delegates
Republican Party Virginia state senators
People from Clintwood, Virginia
20th-century American politicians